Kanal III3b is a drainage canal of North Rhine-Westphalia, Germany. It discharges into the Niers near Grefrath.

References

CKanalIII3b
Geography of North Rhine-Westphalia
Canals in Germany